Liqiliqini (Aymara liqiliqi, liqi liqi Southern lapwing or Andean lapwing,-ni a suffix to indicate ownership, "the one with the Southern lapwing (or Andean lapwing)", also spelled Leke Lekeni, Lekelekeni)  is a  mountain in the Bolivian Andes. It is located in the La Paz Department, Loayza Province, Cairoma Municipality, southwest of the village of Wila Pampa. Liqiliqini lies northwest of Wayra Willk'i, Wanuni and Uyuyuni.

References 

Mountains of La Paz Department (Bolivia)